Vansh Bajaj (born 15 October 1996) is an Indian cricketer. In 2014, whilst studying at Ellesmere College, in Shropshire, he earned a place at one of the six Marylebone Cricket Club University teams in England. In 2016, he received the Marylebone Cricket Club (MCC) Spirit of Cricket Award, which was presented to him at Lord's. He made his first-class debut on 26 March 2019, for Cambridge MCCU against Essex, as part of the Marylebone Cricket Club University fixtures.

References

External links
 

1996 births
Living people
Indian cricketers
Cambridge MCCU cricketers
Place of birth missing (living people)